The Church of the Assumption of the Blessed Virgin Mary is a Roman Catholic church in Palanga, Lithuania.

History

The first small wooden Catholic church in Palanga was built around 1540 at the behest of Grand Duchess Anna Jagiellon. Another cross-shaped church with a tower and a belfry was built in 1590 at the initiative of the then rulers of Lithuania.

In 1767, the wooden church was reconstructed and stood for 140 years.

In 1897, according to the project of the Swedish architect Karl Eduard Strandmann, the construction of a new Gothic Revival style church began next to the old church, which was consecrated in 1906 and completed in 1907. Following the completion of a new brick masonry church with 24 metres spire, the old wooden church was demolished.

Gallery

References

External links 

Parish of the Palanga Assumption of the Blessed Virgin Mary

Roman Catholic churches in Palanga
Gothic Revival church buildings in Lithuania
20th-century Roman Catholic church buildings in Lithuania
Roman Catholic churches completed in 1906
1907 establishments in Europe